Enrico Intra (born 3 July 1935 in Milan, Italy) is an Italian jazz pianist, composer, conductor.

During his long career, Intra has collaborated with such notable musicians as Gerry Mulligan, Franco Cerri, Lee Konitz, Milton Jackson, Severino Gazzelloni, Pino Presti, Tullio De Piscopo, David Liebman and others.

Works 
 La Messa d'Oggi Ri-Fi RFL ST 14043, 1971
 Archetipo (Suite for Sextet with Violoncello and Oboe)
 Contro la seduzione 
 Dissonanza-Consonanza 
 The Blues
 Nosferatu
 Bach-Cage-Intra
 Nuova Civiltà
Nicole

Discography 

 To the Victims of Vietnam,  Ri-Fi, 1974
 Gerry Mulligan meets Enrico Intra, with Pino Presti and Tullio De Piscopo, Produttori Associati, 1976  
 The Blues, CD, Album, Dire, 1991
 Wach im Dunklen Garten. Instrumentalmusik nach Gregorianischen Gesängen Kreuz, CD, 1999
 Bernstein/Gershwin/Rodgers, with the Civica Jazz Band and Franco Cerri, Soul Note, CD, 2000
 Live!, Distr. IRD, CD, 2005
 Le case di Berio, Audio CD, Album,  Rai Trade, Alfa Music, 2005
 Like Monk, Alfa Music, Audio CD, 2006
 Franco Cerri & Enrico Intra  Jazz Italiano Live 2007, MAG 2007
 David Liebman/Enrico Intra Liebman meets Intra Contenuto Alfa Music, CD, 2008
 Franco Ambrosetti/Enrico Intra Live In Milan, Duo, Trio, Quartet, CD, Album, Albore Jazz, 2009
 Gregoriani & Spirituals, Alfa Music, Audio CD, 2018

References 
 

Italian jazz pianists
Italian male pianists
Italian male conductors (music)
Italian composers
Italian male composers
Musicians from Milan
Living people
1935 births
20th-century Italian conductors (music)
21st-century Italian conductors (music)
21st-century pianists
20th-century Italian male musicians
21st-century Italian male musicians
Male jazz musicians